Northcote College is a New Zealand secondary school for boys and girls (co-educational) located in Northcote, Auckland. The school caters for Form 3 (Year 9) to Form 7 (Year 13). It was founded in 1877 and is the oldest secondary school on the North Shore.

Sporting codes and cultural activities include rugby, football (soccer), drama/performance, jazz band, orchestra, theatre sports and cultural groups. The school rules are based on respect and aimed at encouraging hard work, courtesy and concern for others.

The school's motto is Ut Prosim Aliis | Kia Manaaki te Tangata | That I May Be of Service to Others.

Notable alumni

 Steven Ferguson (born 8 May 1980), Olympian, swimming and kayaking
 Arthur Jennings (born 1940), 1967 All Black
 Alexa Johnston, art curator and author
 Kevin Locke (born 4 April 1989), rugby league, Warriors and NZ Kiwis
 Nisha Madhan, actor, director and producer
 Bill Ralston (born 1953), journalist and broadcaster (graduated 1971)
 Mike Rann (born 1953), premier of South Australia (graduated 1970)
 Hollie Smith (born 1982), singer-songwriter
 Nick Williams (born 1983), rugby player North Harbour, Blues
 Martin Winch (1949–2011), guitarist, composer, sound engineer, teacher and mentor
 George Wood (born 1946), Auckland councillor and former Mayor of North Shore City
 Terry Wright (born 1963), All Black 1986–92
 Anne Wyllie, scientist who developed the COVID-19 saliva test

References

External links
 Northcote College website

Educational institutions established in 1877
Secondary schools in Auckland
North Shore, New Zealand
1877 establishments in New Zealand